The Klinikum St. Georg is the oldest, and, after Leipzig University Hospital, the second largest hospital in Leipzig, Germany. It was founded in 1212. It consists of the Klinikum St. Georg gGmbH, and the Municipal Hospital "St. Georg" Leipzig (operated by the City of Leipzig). The hospital currently employs over 3,500 people and has 1,066 beds in 25 clinics. In addition, the gGmbH and the municipal hospital function as an academic teaching hospital of Leipzig University.

References

Hospitals in Germany
Organisations based in Leipzig
Health facilities that treated Ebola patients
Municipal hospitals
Medical and health organisations based in Saxony